The Kānvar (or Kānwar/ Kāvaḍ) Yātrā (Devanagari: कांवड़ यात्रा) is an annual pilgrimage of devotees of Shiva, known as Kānvarias(कावड़िया) or "Bhole" (भोले), to Hindu pilgrimage places of Haridwar, Gaumukh and Gangotri in Uttarakhand and Sultanganj in Bihar to fetch holy waters of Ganges River. Millions of pilgrims fetch sacred water from river Ganga and carry on their shoulders for hundreds of miles to offer it in their local Śiva shrines, or specific temples such as Pura Mahadeva and Augharnath temple in Meerut, and Kashi Vishwanath, Baidyanath, and Deoghar in Jharkhand.

At its base, Kanwar refers to a genre of religious performances where participants ritually carry water from a holy source in containers suspended on either side of a pole. The pilgrimage derives its name from the contraption, called kanwar, and while the source of the water is often the Ganga, it can also be its local equivalents. The 
offering is dedicated to Shiva, often addressed as Bhola (innocent) or Bhole Baba (innocent old man). The pilgrim, accordingly, is a bhola, and in the vocative, bhole! Although there is little mention of the Kanwar as an organized festival in canonical texts, the phenomenon surely existed in the early nineteenth century when English travelers report seeing Kanwar pilgrims at many points during their journeys in the north Indian plains.

The Yatra used to be a small affair undertaken by a few saints and older devotees until the late 1980s, when it started gaining popularity. Today, the Kanwar pilgrimage to Haridwar in particular has grown to be India's largest annual religious gathering, with an estimated 12 million participants in the 2010 and 2011 events. The devotees come from the surrounding states of Delhi, Uttar Pradesh, Haryana, Rajasthan, Punjab, Bihar and some from Jharkhand, Chhattisgarh, Odisha and Madhya Pradesh. Heavy security measures are undertaken by the government and the traffic on Delhi-Haridwar national highway (National Highway 58) is diverted for the period.

Outside of India, the tradition has led to the annual Maha Shivaratri pilgrimage where around half a million Hindus in Mauritius go on a pilgrimage to Ganga Talao, many walking bare feet from their homes carrying Kanvars

Etymology
Kanwar Yatra is named after the kānvar (कांवड़), a single pole (usually made of bamboo) with two roughly equal loads fastened or dangling from opposite ends. The kānvar is carried by balancing the middle of the pole on one or both shoulders. The Hindi word kānvar is derived from the Sanskrit kānvānrathi (काँवाँरथी). Kānvar-carrying pilgrims, called Kānvariās, carry covered water-pots in kānvars slung across their shoulders. This practice of carrying Kavad as a part of religious pilgrimage, especially by devotees of Lord Shiva, is widely followed throughout India (see Kavadi). Yatra means a journey or procession.

History

Kanwar yatra is related to the churning of the ocean of milk in the Hindu Puranas. When the poison came out before  Amrita and the world started burning from its heat then lord Shiva accepted to inhale poison. But, after inhaling it he started suffering from negative energy of poison. In Treta Yuga Shiva's devout follower Ravana did meditation. He brought holy water of Ganga by using kanwar and poured it on Shiva's temple in Puramahadev.  Thus releasing Shiva from the negative energy of the poison.

Contemporary events 
In 2018, there were multiple incidents of violence and vandalism associated with Kanwar Yatra in National Capital Region and Uttar Pradesh. The Supreme Court of India made harsh remarks on such incidents. In the year 2020, Kanwar Yatra was cancelled due to COVID-19 pandemic in India. In 2021, Uttarakhand decided to suspend the yatra in light of the disastrous second wave of COVID-19 in the country. However, Uttar Pradesh decided to move ahead with the yatra and Supreme Court of India took a suo moto case on the matter.

Bol Bam

Bol-Bam refers to pilgrimages and festivals in India and Nepal glorifying Shiva (aka Bam or Bum).

The festivals run during the monsoon month Shraawan (July — August). After taking water from the Ganges river (or other nearby river that wind up in the Ganges) the pilgrims, known as kanwariya or Shiv Bhaktas (disciples of Shiva),  are mandated to travel barefooted and in saffron robes with their Kanwar (walking sticks used to hang the urns of water)  for 105 km by various routes and usually in groups made of family, friends and or neighbors, and return to their own local or other more prestigious and larger Shiva Temples to pour Gangajal on Lord Shiva (Shiv Linga).  On the march pilgrims continuously sprinkle any and all talk with "Bol Bam" (speak the name of Bam) and sing Bhajans (hymns) to praise his name.

The Yatra

The month of Shraavana is dedicated to Lord Shiva and most devotees observe a fast on Mondays during the month, as it also falls during the chaturmas period, traditionally set aside for religious pilgrimages, bathing in holy rivers and penance.  During the annual Monsoon season thousands of saffron-clad pilgrims carrying water from the Ganges in Haridwar, Gangotri or Gaumukh, the glacier from where the Ganges originates and other holy places on the Ganges, like Sultanganj, the only place where the river turns north during its course, and return to their hometowns, where they later perform abhisheka (anointing) the Shivalingas at the local Shiva temples, as a gesture of thanksgiving.

While most pilgrims are men, a few women also participate in Yatra. Most travel the distance on foot, a few also travel on bicycles, motor cycles, scooters, mini trucks or jeeps. Numerous Hindu organizations and other voluntary organizations like local Kanwar Sanghs, the Rashtriya Swayamsevak Sangh and the Vishwa Hindu Parishad setup camps along the National Highways during the Yatra, where food, shelter, medical-aid and stand to hang the Kanvads, holding the Ganges water is provided.

Smaller pilgrimages are also undertaken to places like Allahabad and Varanasi. Shravani Mela is a major festival at Deoghar in Jharkhand, where thousands of saffron-clad pilgrims bringing holy water, from the Ganges at Sultanganj, covering a distance of 105 kilometres on foot and offer it to lord baidyanath (Shiva). Here till about 1960, the yatra was confined to a few saints, old devotees, and rich Marwaris of neighbouring cities, and the phenomenon has seen considerable rise in the recent years.

Once the pilgrims reach their hometown, the Ganges water is used to bathe the Shivalingam on the thirteenth day (Triyodashi) in Shravan month or on the Maha Shivratri day.

See also
 Famous Hindu yatras
 Hindu pilgrimage sites in India
 List of Hindu festivals
 Padayatra
 Ratha Yatra
 Tirtha
 Tirtha and Kshetra

References

Further reading
 

Hindu festivals
Shaivism
Haridwar
Culture of Uttarakhand
Culture of Uttar Pradesh
Culture of Bihar
Religious festivals in India